This is a list of beetle species in Britain.

Suborder Adephaga 
Family Carabidae
See List of ground beetle (Carabidae) species recorded in Britain

Families Gyrinidae, Haliplidae, Noteridae, Paelobiidae and Dytiscidae
See List of water beetle species recorded in Britain

Suborder Myxophaga 
Family Sphaeriusidae
 Sphaerius microsporus

Suborder Polyphaga

Infraorder Bostrichiformia

Superfamily Bostrichoidea 
Family Dermestidae
Anthrenocerus australis – Australian carpet beetle
Anthrenus coloratus
Anthrenus flavipes – furniture carpet beetle
Anthrenus fuscus
Anthrenus museorum – museum beetle
Anthrenus olgae
Anthrenus pimpinellae
Anthrenus sarnicus – Guernsey carpet beetle
Anthrenus scrophulariae – common carpet beetle
Anthrenus verbasci – varied carpet beetle
Attagenus brunneus
Attagenus cyphonoides
Attagenus fasciatus – tobacco seed beetle
Attagenus pellio – fur beetle
Attagenus smirnovi
Attagenus trifasciatus
Attagenus unicolor – black carpet beetle
Ctesias serra
Dermestes ater
Dermestes carnivorus
Dermestes frischii
Dermestes haemorrhoidalis – black larder beetle
Dermestes lardarius – larder beetle
Dermestes leechi
Dermestes maculatus – hide beetle
Dermestes murinus
Dermestes peruvianus – Peruvian larder beetle
Dermestes undulatus
Globicornis nigripes
Megatoma undata
Orphinus fulvipes
Reesa vespulae
Thorictodes heydeni
Thylodrias contractus – odd beetle, tissue paper beetle
Trinodes hirtus
Trogoderma angustum
Trogoderma glabrum
Trogoderma granarium – Khapra beetle, cabinet beetle
Trogoderma inclusum – large cabinet beetle
Trogoderma variabile

Family Bostrichidae
 Bostrichus capucinus
 Bostrychoplites cornutus
 Lyctus brunneus
 Lyctus cavicollis
 Lyctus linearis – European lyctus beetle
 Lyctus planicollis – southern lyctus beetle 
 Lyctus sinensis
 Rhyzopertha dominica – lesser grain borer
 Stephanopachys substriatus
 Trogoxylon parallelopipedum

Family Ptinidae
Anitys rubens
Anobium inexspectatum
Anobium punctatum – common furniture beetle
Caenocara affinis
Caenocara bovistae
Dorcatoma ambjoerni
Dorcatoma chrysomelina
Dorcatoma dresdensis
Dorcatoma flavicornis
Dorcatoma serra
Dryophilus anobioides
Dryophilus pusillus
Ernobius abietis
Ernobius angusticollis
Ernobius gigas
Ernobius mollis
Ernobius nigrinus
Ernobius pini
Gastrallus immarginatus
Gibbium aequinoctiale
Gibbium psylloides
Grynobius planus
Hadrobregmus denticollis
Hemicoelus fulvicornis
Hemicoelus nitidus
Lasioderma serricorne – cigarette beetle
Mezium affine
Niptus hololeucus – golden spider beetle
Ochina ptinoides – ivy boring beetle
Pseudeurostus hilleri
Ptilinus pectinicornis – fan-bearing wood-borer
Ptinomorphus imperialis
Ptinus clavipes
Ptinus dubius
Ptinus exulans
Ptinus fur – white-marked spider beetle
Ptinus lichenum
Ptinus palliatus
Ptinus pilosus
Ptinus pusillus
Ptinus raptor
Ptinus sexpunctatus
Ptinus subpilosus
Ptinus tectus – Australian spider beetle
Ptinus villiger
Sphaericus gibboides
Stegobium paniceum – drugstore beetle, biscuit beetle
Stethomezium squamosum
Tipnus unicolor
Trigonogenius globulus – globular spider beetle
Tropicoptinus latefasciatus (formerly Ptinus latefasciatus))
Xestobium rufovillosum – deathwatch beetle
Xyletinus longitarsis

Superfamily Derodontoidea 
Family Derodontidae
 Larcobius erichsonii

Infraorder Cucujiformia

Superfamily Chrysomeloidea 
Family Cerambycidae
See List of longhorn beetle (Cerambycidae) species recorded in Britain

Family Orsodacnidae
 Orsodacne cerasi
 Orsodacne humeralis

Family Megalopodidae
 Zeugophora flavicollis
 Zeugophora subspinosa
 Zeugophora turneri

Family Chrysomelidae
See List of leaf beetle (Chrysomelidae) species recorded in Britain

Superfamily Cleroidea 
Family Phloiophilidae
 Phloiophilus edwardsii

Family Trogossitidae
 Lophocateres pusillus
 Nemozoma elongatum
 Ostoma ferrugineum
 Tenebroides mauritanicus – cadelle beetle
 Thymalus limbatus

Family Cleridae
 Korynetes caeruleus – steely blue beetle
 Necrobia ruficollis 
 Necrobia rufipes – red-legged ham beetle
 Necrobia violacea
 Opilo mollis
 Paratillus carus
 Tarsostenus univittatus
 Thanasimus femoralis
 Thanasimus formicarius – ant beetle, European red-bellied clerid 
 Thaneroclerus buquet
 Tilloidea unifasciata
 Tillus elongatus
 Trichodes alvearius
 Trichodes apiarius

Family Melyridae
 Anthocomus fasciatus
 Anthocomus rufus
 Aplocnemus impressus
 Aplocnemus nigricornis
 Axinotarsus marginalis
 Axinotarsus pulicarius
 Axinotarsus ruficollis
 Cerapheles terminatus
 Clanoptilus barnevillei
 Clanoptilus marginellus
 Clanoptilus strangulatus
 Cordylepherus viridis
 Dasytes aeratus
 Dasytes cyaneus
 Dasytes niger
 Dasytes plumbeus
 Dasytes virens
 Dolichosoma lineare
 Ebaeus pedicularius
 Hypebaeus flavipes
 Malachius aeneus
 Malachius bipustulatus – malachite beetle
 Psilothrix viridicoeruleus
 Sphinginus lobatus
 Troglops cephalotes

Superfamily Cucujoidea 
Family Sphindidae
 Aspidiphorus orbiculatus
 Sphindus dubius
Family Kateretidae
 Brachypterolus antirrhini
 Brachypterolus linariae
 Brachypterolus pulicarius
 Brachypterolus vestitus
 Brachypterus glaber
 Brachypterus urticae
 Kateretes pedicularius
 Kateretes pusillus
 Kateretes rufilabris

Family Nitidulidae (pollen beetles)
See List of pollen beetles (Nitidulidae) recorded in Britain

Family Monotomidae
 Cyanostolus aeneus
 Monotoma angusticollis
 Monotoma bicolor
 Monotoma brevicollis
 Monotoma conicicollis
 Monotoma longicollis
 Monotoma picipes
 Monotoma quadricollis
 Monotoma quadrifoveolata
 Monotoma spinicollis
 Monotoma testacea
 Rhizophagus bipustulatus
 Rhizophagus cribratus
 Rhizophagus depressus
 Rhizophagus dispar
 Rhizophagus ferrugineus
 Rhizophagus grandis
 Rhizophagus nitidulus
 Rhizophagus oblongicollis
 Rhizophagus parallelocollis
 Rhizophagus parvulus
 Rhizophagus perforatus
 Rhizophagus picipes

Family Silvanidae
 Ahasverus advena – foreign grain beetle
 Cathartus quadricollis – square-necked grain beetle
 Cryptamorpha desjardinsii – Desjardins' beetle
 Dendophagus crenatus
 Nausibius clavicornis 
 Oryzaephilus mercator – merchant grain beetle
 Oryzaephilus surinamensis – saw-toothed grain beetle
 Psammoecus bipunctatus
 Silvanus bidentatus
 Silvanoprus fagi
 Silvanus unidentatus
 Uleiota planata
Family Cucujidae
 Pediacus depressus
 Pediacus dermestoides

Family Laemophloeidae
 Cryptolestes capensis
 Cryptolestes duplicatus
 Cryptolestes ferrugineus
 Cryptolestes pusilloides
 Cryptolestes pusillus
 Cryptolestes spartii
 Cryptolestes turcicus
 Laemophloeus monilis
 Leptophoeus clematidis
 Leptophoeus janeti
 Notolaemus unifasciatus

Family Phalacridae
Olibrus aeneus
Olibrus affinis
Olibrus corticalis
Olibrus flavicornis
Olibrus liquidus
Olibrus millefolii
Olibrus pygmaeus
Phalacrus brunnipes
Phalacrus caricis
Phalacrus corruscus
Phalacrus fimetarius
Phalacrus substriatus
Stilbus atomarius
Stilbus oblongus
Stilbus testaceus

Family Cryptophagidae
 Antherophagus canescens
 Antherophagus nigricornis
 Antherophagus pallens
 Atomaria apicalis
 Atomaria atra
 Atomaria atricapilla
 Atomaria badia
 Atomaria barani
 Atomaria basalis
 Atomaria bella
 Atomaria clavigera
 Atomaria diluta
 Atomaria fimetarii
 Atomaria fuscata
 Atomaria fuscipes
 Atomaria gutta
 Atomaria hislopi
 Atomaria impressa
 Atomaria lewisi
 Atomaria linearis – pygmy mangel beetle
 Atomaria lohsei
 Atomaria mesomela
 Atomaria morio
 Atomaria munda
 Atomaria nigripennis
 Atomaria nigrirostris
 Atomaria nigriventris
 Atomaria nitidula
 Atomaria ornata
 Atomaria peltata
 Atomaria procerula
 Atomaria pseudatra
 Atomaria pulchra
 Atomaria puncticollis
 Atomaria punctithorax
 Atomaria pusilla

 Atomaria rhenana
 Atomaria rubella
 Atomaria rubida
 Atomaria rubricollis
 Atomaria scutellaris
 Atomaria strandi
 Atomaria testacea
 Atomaria turgida
 Atomaria umbrina
 Atomaria wollastoni
 Atomaria zetterstedti
 Caenoscelis ferruginea
 Caenoscelis sibirica
 Caenoscelis subdeplanata
 Cryptophagus acuminatus
 Cryptophagus acutangulus
 Cryptophagus angustus
 Cryptophagus badius
 Cryptophagus cellaris
 Cryptophagus confusus
 Cryptophagus corticinus
 Cryptophagus dentatus
 Cryptophagus distinguendus
 Cryptophagus falcozi
 Cryptophagus fallax
 Cryptophagus fuscicornis
 Cryptophagus hexagonalis
 Cryptophagus immixtus
 Cryptophagus intermedius
 Cryptophagus labilis
 Cryptophagus lapponicus
 Cryptophagus laticollis
 Cryptophagus lycoperdi
 Cryptophagus micaceus
 Cryptophagus obsoletus
 Cryptophagus pallidus
 Cryptophagus pilosus
 Cryptophagus populi
 Cryptophagus pseudodentatus
 Cryptophagus pubescens
 Cryptophagus rotundatus
 Cryptophagus ruficornis
 Cryptophagus saginatus
 Cryptophagus scanicus
 Cryptophagus schmidtii
 Cryptophagus scutellatus
 Cryptophagus setulosus
 Cryptophagus simplex
 Cryptophagus subdepressus
 Cryptophagus subfumatus
 Cryptophagus subvittatus
 Ephistemus globulus
 Henoticus californicus
 Henoticus serratus
 Hypocoprus latridioides
 Micrambe abietis
 Micrambe aubrooki
 Micrambe bimaculata
 Micrambe lindbergorum
 Micrambe villosa
 Micrambe vini
 Ootypus globosus
 Paramecosoma melanocephalum
 Telmatophilus brevicollis
 Telmatophilus caricis
 Telmatophilus schoenherrii
 Telmatophilus sparganii
 Telmatophilus typhae
Family Erotylidae
 Dacne bipustulata
 Dacne rufifrons
 Triplax aenea
 Triplax lacordairii
 Triplax russica
 Triplax scutellaris
 Tritoma bipustulata

Family Byturidae
 Byturus ochraceus
 Byturus tomentosus – raspberry beetle

Family Biphyllidae
 Biphyllus lunatus
 Diplocoelus fagi

Family Bothrideridae
 Anommatus diecki
 Anommatus duodecimstriatus
 Oxylaemus cylindricus
 Oxylaemus variolosus
 Teredus cylindricus

Family Cerylonidae
 Cerylon fagi
 Cerylon ferrugineum
 Cerylon histeroides
 Murmidius ovalis
 Murmidius segregatus

Family Alexiidae
 Sphaerosoma pilosum

Family Endomychidae
 Endomychus coccineus
 Holoparamecus caularum
 Holoparamecus depressus
 Holoparamecus singularis
 Lycoperdina bovistae
 Lycoperdina succincta
 Mycetaea subterranea
 Symbiotes latus
Family Coccinellidae (ladybirds)
See List of ladybirds and related beetle species recorded in Britain

Family Corylophidae
 Corylophus cassidoides
 Corylophus sublaevipennis
 Orthoperus aequalis
 Orthoperus atomarius
 Orthoperus atomus
 Orthoperus brunnipes
 Orthoperus corticalis
 Orthoperus nigrescens
 Rypobius praetermissus
 Sericoderus lateralis
Family Latridiidae
Adistemia watsoni
Cartodere bifasciata
Cartodere constricta
Cartodere nodifer
Cartodere norvegica
Corticaria abietorum
Corticaria alleni
Corticaria crenulata
Corticaria dubia
Corticaria elongata
Corticaria fagi
Corticaria ferruginea
Corticaria fulva
Corticaria impressa
Corticaria inconspicua
Corticaria longicollis
Corticaria polypori
Corticaria punctulata
Corticaria rubripes
Corticaria serrata
Corticaria umbilicata
Corticarina fulvipes
Corticarina fuscula
Corticarina lambiana
Corticarina latipennis
Corticarina similata
Corticarina truncatella
Cortinicara gibbosa
Dienerella argus
Dienerella clathrata
Dienerella elegans
Dienerella elongata
Dienerella filiformis
Dienerella filum
Dienerella ruficollis
Dienerella schueppeli
Enicmus brevicornis
Enicmus fungicola
Enicmus histrio
Enicmus rugosus
Enicmus testaceus
Enicmus transversus
Latridius anthracinus
Latridius consimilis
Latridius minutus
Latridius pseudominutus
Lithostygnus serripennis
Melanophthalma curticollis
Melanophthalma distinguenda
Melanophthalma suturalis
Stephostethus alternans
Stephostethus angusticollis
Stephostethus lardarius
Thes bergrothi

Superfamily Curculionoidea 
See List of weevil (Curculionoidea) species recorded in Britain

Superfamily Lymexyloidea 
Family Lymexylidae
 Hylecoetus dermestoides
 Lymexylon navale

Superfamily Tenebrionoidea 
See List of beetle species recorded in Britain - superfamily Tenebrionoidea

Infraorder Elateriformia

Superfamily Buprestoidea 
Family Buprestidae

 Agrilus angustulus
 Agrilus biguttatus
 Agrilus laticornis
 Agrilus sinuatus
 Agrilus sulcicollis
 Agrilus viridis – beech splendour beetle
 Anthaxia nitidula
 Anthaxia quadripunctata
 Anthaxia salicis
 Aphanisticus emarginatus
 Aphanisticus pusillus
 Bupretis aurulenta – golden buprestid
 Melanophila acuminata
 Trachys minutus
 Trachys scrobiculatus
 Trachys troglodytes

Superfamily Byrrhoidea 
Family Byrrhidae

 Byrrhus arietinus
 Byrrhus fasciatus
 Byrrhus pilula
 Byrrhus pustulatus
 Chaetophora spinosa
 Curimopsis maritima
 Curimopsis nigrita – mire pill beetle
 Curimopsis setigera
 Cytilus sericeus
 Morychus aeneus
 Porcinolus murinus
 Simplocaria maculosa
 Simplocaria semistriata

Families Elmidae, Dryopidae and Limnichidae
See List of water beetle species recorded in Britain

Family Heteroceridae
 Augyles hispidulus
 Augyles maritimus
 Heterocerus femoralis
 Heterocerus fenestratus
 Heterocerus flexuosus
 Heterocerus fossor
 Heterocerus fusculus
 Heterocerus marginatus
 Heterocerus obsoletus

Family Psephenidae
 Eubria palustris

Superfamily Dascilloidea 
Family Dascillidae
 Dascillus cervinus

Superfamily Elateroidea 
Family Eucnemidae

 Epiphanis cornutus
 Eucnemis capucina
 Hylis cariniceps
 Hylis olexai
 Melasis buprestoides
 Microrhagus pygmaeus

Family Throscidae
 Aulonothrosucus brevicollis
 Trixagus carinifrons
 Trixagus dermestoides
 Trixagus gracilis
 Trixagus obtusus

Family Elateridae (click beetles)
See List of click beetle (Elateridae) species recorded in Britain

Family Drilidae
 Drilus flavescens

Family Lycidae
 Dictyoptera aurora
 Platycis cosnardi
 Platycis minutus
 Pyropterus nigroruber
Family Lampyridae
 Lamprohiza splendidula
 Lampyris noctiluca – common glow-worm
 Phosphaenus hemipterus – lesser glow-worm

Family Cantharidae
See List of soldier beetle (Cantharidae) species recorded in Britain

Superfamily Scirtoidea 
Family Eucinetidae
 Eucinetus meridionalis

Family Clambidae
 Calyptomerus dubius
 Clambus armadillo
 Clambus evae
 Clambus gibbulus
 Clambus nigrellus
 Clambus nigriclavis
 Clambus pallidulus
 Clambus pubescens
 Clambus punctulus
 Clambus simsoni

Family Scirtidae
 Cyphon coarctatus
 Cyphon hilaris
 Cyphon kongsbergensis
 Cyphon laevipennis
 Cyphon ochraceus
 Cyphon padi
 Cyphon palustris
 Cyphon pubescens
 Cyphon punctipennis
 Cyphon variabilis
 Elodes elongata
 Elodes minuta
 Elodes pseudominuta
 Elodes tricuspis
 Hydrocyphon deflexicollis
 Microcara testacea
 Odeles marginata
 Prionocyphon serricornis
 Scirtes hemisphaericus
 Scirtes orbicularis

Infraorder Scarabaeiformia

Superfamily Scarabaeoidea 
See List of dung beetle and chafer (Scarabaeoidea) species recorded in Britain

Infraorder Staphyliniformia

Superfamily Histeroidea 
Family Sphaeritidae
 Sphaerites glabratus

Family Histeridae
Abraeus granulum
Abraeus perpusillus
Acritus homoeopathicus
Acritus nigricornis
Aeletes atomarius
Atholus bimaculatus
Atholus duodecimstriatus
Carcinops pumilio
Dendrophilus punctatus
Dendrophilus pygmaeus
Dendrophilus xavieri
Epierus comptus
Gnathoncus buyssoni
Gnathoncus communis
Gnathoncus nannetensis
Gnathoncus rotundatus
Halacritus punctum
Hetaerius ferrugineus
Hister bissexstriatus
Hister illigeri
Hister quadrimaculatus
Hister quadrinotatus
Hister unicolor
Hypocaccus dimidiatus
Hypocaccus metallicus
Hypocaccus rugiceps
Hypocaccus rugifrons
Kissister minimus
Margarinotus brunneus
Margarinotus marginatus
Margarinotus merdarius
Margarinotus neglectus
Margarinotus obscurus
Margarinotus purpurascens
Margarinotus striola
Margarinotus ventralis
Myrmetes paykulli
Onthophilus punctatus
Onthophilus striatus
Paromalus flavicornis
Paromalus parallelepipedus
Plegaderus dissectus
Plegaderus vulneratus
Saprinus aeneus
Saprinus immundus
Saprinus planiusculus
Saprinus semistriatus
Saprinus subnitescens
Saprinus virescens
Teretrius fabricii

Superfamily Hydrophiloidea 
See List of water beetle species recorded in Britain

Superfamily Staphylinoidea 
Family Hydraenidae
See List of water beetle species recorded in Britain

Family Ptiliidae
Acrotrichis arnoldi
Acrotrichis atomaria
Acrotrichis brevipennis
Acrotrichis cephalotes
Acrotrichis cognata
Acrotrichis danica
Acrotrichis dispar
Acrotrichis fascicularis
Acrotrichis grandicollis
Acrotrichis insularis
Acrotrichis intermedia
Acrotrichis josephi
Acrotrichis lucidula
Acrotrichis montandonii
Acrotrichis norvegica
Acrotrichis parva
Acrotrichis pumila
Acrotrichis rosskotheni
Acrotrichis rugulosa
Acrotrichis sanctaehelenae
Acrotrichis sericans
Acrotrichis silvatica
Acrotrichis sitkaensis
Acrotrichis strandi
Acrotrichis thoracica
Actidium aterrimum
Actidium coarctatum
Actinopteryx fucicola
Baeocrara variolosa
Euryptilium gillmeisteri
Euryptilium saxonicum
Micridium halidaii
Microptilium palustre
Microptilium pulchellum
Millidium minutissimum
Nephanes titan
Nossidium pilosellum
Oligella foveolata
Oligella insignis
Oligella intermedia
Ptenidium brenskei
Ptenidium formicetorum
Ptenidium fuscicorne
Ptenidium gressneri
Ptenidium intermedium
Ptenidium laevigatum
Ptenidium longicorne
Ptenidium nitidum
Ptenidium punctatum
Ptenidium pusillum
Ptenidium turgidum
Pteryx suturalis
Ptiliola brevicollis
Ptiliola kunzei
Ptiliolum caledonicum
Ptiliolum fuscum
Ptiliolum marginatum
Ptiliolum sahlbergi
Ptiliolum schwarzi
Ptiliolum spencei
Ptilium affine
Ptilium caesum
Ptilium exaratum
Ptilium horioni
Ptilium myrmecophilum
Ptinella aptera
Ptinella britannica
Ptinella cavelli
Ptinella denticollis
Ptinella errabunda
Ptinella limbata
Ptinella simsoni
Ptinella taylorae
Smicrus filicornis

Family Leiodidae
 Agaricophagus cephalotes
 Agathidium arcticum
 Agathidium atrum
 Agathidium confusum
 Agathidium convexum
 Agathidium laevigatum
 Agathidium marginatum
 Agathidium nigrinum

 Agathidium nigripenne
 Agathidium pisanum
 Agathidium rotundatum
 Agathidium seminulum
 Agathidium varians
 Aglyptinus agathidioides
 Amphicyllis globus
 Anisotoma castanea
 Anisotoma glabra
 Anisotoma humeralis
 Anisotoma orbicularis
 Catopidius depressus
 Catops chrysomeloides
 Catops coracinus
 Catops fuliginosus
 Catops fuscus
 Catops grandicollis
 Catops kirbii
 Catops longulus
 Catops morio
 Catops nigricans
 Catops nigriclavis
 Catops nigrita
 Catops tristis
 Choleva agilis
 Choleva angustata
 Choleva cisteloides
 Choleva elongata
 Choleva fagniezi
 Choleva glauca
 Choleva jeanneli
 Choleva lederiana
 Choleva oblonga
 Choleva spadicea
 Colenis immunda
 Colon angulare
 Colon appendiculatum
 Colon brunneum
 Colon dentipes
 Colon latum
 Colon rufescens
 Colon serripes
 Colon viennense
 Colon zebei
 Hydnobius latifrons
 Hydnobius punctatus
 Hydnobius spinipes
 Leiodes badia
 Leiodes calcarata
 Leiodes ciliaris
 Leiodes cinnamomea
 Leiodes ferruginea
 Leiodes flavescens
 Leiodes furva
 Leiodes gallica
 Leiodes gyllenhalii
 Leiodes litura
 Leiodes longipes
 Leiodes lucens
 Leiodes lunicollis
 Leiodes macropus
 Leiodes nigrita
 Leiodes obesa
 Leiodes oblonga
 Leiodes picea
 Leiodes rufipennis
 Leiodes rugosa
 Leiodes silesiaca
 Leiodes strigipennis
 Leiodes triepkii
 Leptinus testaceus
 Liocyrtusa minuta
 Liocyrtusa vittata
 Nargus anisotomoides
 Nargus velox
 Nargus wilkinii
 Nemadus colonoides
 Parabathyscia wollastoni
 Ptomaphagus medius
 Ptomaphagus subvillosus
 Ptomaphagus varicornis
 Sciodrepoides fumatus
 Sciodrepoides watsoni
 Sogda suturalis
 Triarthron maerkelii

Family Scydmaenidae
Cephennium gallicum
Euconnus denticornis
Euconnus duboisi
Euconnus fimetarius
Euconnus hirticollis
Euconnus maeklinii
Euconnus pragensis
Euconnus rutilipennis
Eutheia formicetorum
Eutheia linearis
Eutheia plicata
Eutheia schaumii
Eutheia scydmaenoides
Euthiconus conicicollis
Microscydmus minimus
Microscydmus nanus
Neuraphes angulatus
Neuraphes carinatus
Neuraphes elongatulus
Neuraphes plicicollis
Neuraphes praeteritus
Neuraphes talparum
Scydmaenus rufus
Scydmaenus tarsatus
Scydmoraphes helvolus
Scydmoraphes sparshalli
Stenichnus bicolor
Stenichnus collaris
Stenichnus godarti
Stenichnus poweri
Stenichnus pusillus
Stenichnus scutellaris

Family Silphidae
 Aclypea opaca
 Aclypea undata
 Dendroxena quadrimaculata
 Necrodes littoralis
 Nicrophorus germanicus
 Nicrophorus humator
 Nicrophorus interruptus
 Nicrophorus investigator
 Nicrophorus vespillo
 Nicrophorus vespilloides
 Nicrophorus vestigator
 Oiceoptoma thoracicum
 Silpha atrata
 Silpha carinata
 Silpha laevigata
 Silpha obscura
 Silpha tristis
 Silpha tyrolensis
 Thanatophilus dispar
 Thanatophilus rugosus
 Thanatophilus sinuatus

Family Staphylinidae
See List of rove beetle (Staphylinidae) species recorded in Britain

References

 
Beetles
Beetles of Great Britain
Great Britain